The 1960 Bolivian Primera División, the first division of Bolivian football (soccer), was played by 8 teams. The champions were Jorge Wilstermann.

Group stage

Group A

Group B

Quadrangular Final

Title play-off

External links
 Official website of the LFPB 

Bolivian Primera División seasons
Bolivia
1960 in Bolivian sport